Shivam Tiwari (born 27 February 1996) is an Indian cricketer. He made his List A debut on 27 February 2021, for Services in the 2020–21 Vijay Hazare Trophy. He made his first-class debut on 3 March 2022, for Services in the 2021–22 Ranji Trophy.

References

External links
 

1996 births
Living people
Indian cricketers
Services cricketers
Place of birth missing (living people)